Who the 'ell is Tauriel? is a comedy/parody song and video written by British singer/ukulele player Christopher Winchester and recorded by Winchester's band, The Esgaroth Three.

The song parodies negative fan reaction to the introduction of the character Tauriel in Peter Jackson's Hobbit films, and to other changes made by Jackson in adapting J. R. R. Tolkien's book for the screen.

Reception
Praise for the song and its video has come from international science fiction and fantasy reviewers, and mainstream press. The video has been described as "drolly trollish" on BBC America's Anglophenia website, "brilliant" and "hilarious" by SciFiNow magazine, and "delightfully nerdy" on TheOneRing.net.

Music video
A video for the song was filmed in Pukerua Bay, New Zealand, Jackson's childhood home town, on the 50th Anniversary of the first broadcast of Doctor Who. The video was released to coincide with the release of Jackson's second Hobbit film installment, The Hobbit: The Desolation of Smaug.

Live performance
The song was performed live at the 72nd World Science Fiction Convention, Loncon 3 at ExCeL London in August 2014.

Personnel
The Esgaroth Three
 Christopher Winchester – ukulele, vocals, clarinet, kazoo, percussion, drum and bass programming
 Carlton McRae – guitar, backing vocals

Production
 Christopher Winchester – producer

Video
 Christopher Winchester – director
 Nikky Winchester – producer
 Tim Simpson – 1st assistant director
 Tim Hill – director of photography
 Christopher Winchester – editor

Other personnel
 Christopher Winchester – cover design

References

External links
 Who the 'ell is Tauriel?. (The Esgaroth Three. Video, YouTube. December 2013)
 

Music based on Middle-earth
2013 singles
Songs about fictional female characters
The Hobbit (film series)
Tolkien fandom